Forsvarets Spesialkommando (FSK) (Special Operations Commando) is a special operations forces unit of the Norwegian Special Operation Forces. The unit was established in 1982 due to the increased risk of terrorist activity against Norwegian interests, including the oil platforms in the North Sea.

On 1 January 2014, the Norwegian Special Operation Command (NORSOCOM), was established uniting the FSK and the Naval Special Operation Command (MJK) under the command in the Norwegian Armed Forces. In 2014, FSK established an all female unit Jegertroppen (Jeger Troop).

Introduction
Very little is known publicly about FSK, as the Norwegian government denied their existence and participation in any military operations for a long time. Some details have however emerged after FSK's participation in Operation Enduring Freedom in Afghanistan.

The establishment of FSK was briefly mentioned in an article in the Norwegian newspaper, Aftenposten, in 1983. During a hijacking in Norway in 1985, it was reported that FSK operatives had been put on alert in their base at Trandum, but not requested to assist in any action. A proposal to disband the FSK in 1988, as a financial measure, was met with protests, especially from the oil industry and the military. The plan was shelved after much media attention. Aftenposten reported on the unit as a "special military command composed of highly trained operators from Hærens Jegerkommando at Trandum and Marinejegerkommandoen, in addition to other specialists.

The first time FSK was publicly mentioned by a representative of the armed forces, was in connection with the hijacking of SAS Flight 347 at Gardermoen Airport in September 1993. The following year, the magazine Vi Menn published an article about the FSK. In 1990 the FSK was also mentioned in a research paper: "The Armed Forces' Special Command (FSK) is specially trained to be used in the event of terrorist attacks against oil installations - especially hijacking situations." FSK's existence was only publicly acknowledged by the Norwegian Armed Forces for the first time in 1999, when a piece about the unit appeared in the Armed Forces Magazine Forsvarets Forum (The Defence Forum).

FSK cooperate with special operations forces from several other countries, including the Special Air Service (SAS) and Special Boat Service (SBS) of the United Kingdom, Delta Force, Navy SEALs/DEVGRU of the United States.

History
Forsvarets Spesialkommando can trace its roots back to the Second World War, when Norwegians served in the Norwegian Independent Company 1  (NOR.I.C.1) of the British Special Operations Executive including the famous Operation Gunnerside raid of the heavy water plant at Rjukan.

On 25 March 1962, the Army Parachute Ranger School was created. The focus of this school initially was to provide parachute training for certain groups of personnel within the Norwegian Armed Forces, and eventually the Paratrooper Platoon was established in 1965. Specially selected personnel from this platoon were assigned to Ranger Command 1 in the old mobilization army of the Cold War and were on standby in case of war.

In 1971, the Army Parachute Ranger School changed its name to the Army Ranger School (HJS) to emphasize the training of Army Rangers. The main focus over the next decade was long-range reconnaissance patrols (LRRP). Based on an increase in international terrorism and Norway's newly developed offshore oil services, the government decided in 1979 to establish a counter-terrorism capacity within the Norwegian Armed Forces. In 1982, a decision was finally made that this task be given to the Army Ranger School with Forsvarets Spesialkommando (FSK) established as part of the Army Ranger School. On 1 June 1984, the 38 man unit was operational following assistance from the British Special Air Service and Special Boat Service.

From the mid-1990s there was an increasing focus on international operations. To show that the Army Ranger School now had an operative arm as well as the traditional training role, it changed its name to the Army Ranger Command in 1997. The same year, HJK moved from Trandum to Rena, where the unit is based today.

During the 2000s, HJK changed its name to FSK/HJK, to reflect the two units that make up the command (FSK being the operative wing and HJK being the training wing). In 2004, the unit commenced reporting directly to the Chief of the Army. In 2013, the FSK/HJK name was discontinued and the operative SOF-unit is simply known as FSK.

Today
FSK has gone from being a cadre and training-unit for paratroopers and the mobilization army, to being a professional unit with substantial experience, robustness, competency and capacity. The unit has been deployed internationally on several occasions and has received international recognition for its efforts.

The unit has a considerable amount of support from Norway's political and military leaders. The Norwegian Parliament has decided that the Norwegian SOF are to be strengthened.

FSK recruits, selects and trains paratroopers and SOF operators.

FSK is on both national and international standby for special operations and counter-terrorism operations (alongside Marinejegerkommandoen). In addition, FSK is the competency and training centre for all parachute and counter-terrorism training in the Norwegian Armed Forces.

International operations

Kosovo
FSK and the Kosovo Liberation Army (KLA) cooperated in various ways during the Kosovo conflict. FSK, operating alongside the British SAS, was the first special operations force to enter Pristina. FSK's mission was to level the negotiating field between the belligerent parties, and to fine-tune the details that the local deal required to implement the peace deal between the Serbians and the Kosovo Albanians.

Afghanistan

FSK supported Coalition Special Operations Forces in Operation Enduring Freedom in Afghanistan as part of Task Force K-Bar. They have carried out missions in the Helmand and Uruzgan provinces of South Afghanistan.

In August 2007, FSK members carried out the successful hostage rescue of Christina Meier, a pregnant German NGO worker in Kabul, no shots were fired and the hostage takers were believed to be a criminal gang and not insurgents.

More recently, FSK has had the main responsibility in training the Afghan National Police Crisis Response Unit (CRU 222) in Kabul, under the command of the International Security Assistance Force (known as the Kabul Crisis Response unit-an Afghan counterterrorist SWAT team). During the April 2012 Afghanistan attacks, FSK were involved in combating Taliban insurgents in Kabul, having only recently relieved a New Zealand SAS element that had been mentoring the Kabul Crisis Response unit.

FSK and the Naval Special Operations Commando alternated on the training of CRU from 2016 until June 2021, when the mission was terminated ref. Fall of Kabul (2021).

Forsvarets Spesialkommandos Role

"Forsvarets spesialkommando (FSK) has a role in the Norwegian Armed Forces' independent responsibility to handle an act of terrorism that is considered to be an "armed attack" on Norway, but also has a dedicated mission to support the police in the event counter-terrorism operations at sea. FSK may further assist the police on land." - Norwegian Parliamentary Statement 29 and e-mail address.

In wartime, their tasks are mainly:
  to gather intelligence
  to localize and identify enemy supplies and activity
  to carry out offensive operations against strategically important targets
  to provide support for rescue missions of important personnel
  to provide protection for personnel and departments

Domestic security
From August 2013 FSK shares the national counter-terrorism standby mission together with the 	
Norwegian Naval Special Operations Commando, Norway's other military special force.

Selection and training
Currently, anyone who has completed their military service with the Norwegian Armed Forces can apply.

The road to becoming an elite soldier of the FSK is long and hard. First, one must go through a general selection to separate out those who do not have the physical and mental strength to start the special forces recruitment school. This selection lasts three days. A candidate must do 45 push-ups and 50 sit-ups in two minutes, 8 pull-ups, swim 400 meters in under 11 minutes and march 30 kilometers carrying 25 kilograms in less than 4 hours and 50 minutes. It is emphasized that this is the bare minimum, and that candidates should ideally be able to do more than that. The female troop has lower standards, with one pull-up, 20 push-ups, 35 sit-ups in two minutes or less, 20 back extensions, swim 200 metres (660 ft), with no underwater phobia; and perform a 7-kilometre (4.3 mi) road run carrying 22 kilograms (49 lb) in 59 minutes.

After passing the general selections, an applicant attends the SOF selection. This selection lasts three weeks and comprises hard physical and mental exercises with little food and little sleep. Very few of those who enter the school get through.

Following selection, the potential operator starts basic training (one year). This training involves all basic disciplines required to serve as a SOF operator. Not all who begin basic training get through. After training, one is eligible for operational service in FSK, including training in specialist roles, such as sniper, combat medic, forward air controller, etc. Further training is conducted in Norway or abroad at allied training facilities.

Commanding officers
Commanding officers of FSK include:
 General Harald Sunde (1992–1996)
 Lieutenant colonel Karl Egil Hanevik (2003)
 Eirik Kristoffersen (2010–2014)
 Frode Arnfinn Kristoffersen (2014–2017)
 Brage Andreas Larssen (2017-)

Weapons
The soldiers are or have been trained in the use of these weapons:
 Assault rifles
 Colt Canada C8SFW and C8CQB (default rifle)
 Heckler & Koch HK416
 Submachine guns
 Heckler & Koch MP5
 Heckler & Koch MP7
 Sniper rifles
 Heckler & Koch MSG-90
 Heckler & Koch HK417
 Accuracy International L115A1
 Barrett MRAD
 M82 Barrett rifle
 Pistols
 Heckler & Koch USP
 Glock 17 (known as P-80)
 Grenade launchers
 AG-C/EGLM (Fitted to C8SFW)
 M320 Grenade Launcher Module (Fitted to HK416).
 HK GMG (automatic grenade launcher fitted to Mercedes Benz SF vehicles).
 Machine guns
 FN Minimi (5.56 mm)
 FN Mag (7.62 mm)
 Rheinmetall MG3 (7.62 mm)
 Browning M2 (12.7 mm)
 Shotguns
 Remington 870
 Benelli M4
 Anti-tank weapons
 M72 LAW – Light anti-armor weapon
 84mm Rekylfri Kanon (Carl Gustav M2) - anti-tank weapon

Vehicles
 Geländewagen/MB270 CDI FAV vehicle armoured and EOD protected with 3 weapon-stations (2 MG3 and 1 M2 or GMG). Developed in 2002 and was later modernized. They were used in operation Anaconda due to large amount of space and mounts for equipment and communication. In 2015, a £23 million order was placed for Supacat HMT Extenda vehicles to be delivered from 2017 to 2019.
 Safeguard ship for specialforces - August Nærø . Dockstavarvet AB type IC20M Interceptor

See also
 Special Air Service
 Delta Force
 SEAL Team Six
 Army Ranger Wing
 Jægerkorpset
 Särskilda operationsgruppen

References

External links
 «The FSK official website»

 
Military units and formations established in 1981
Counterterrorist organizations
Recipients of the Presidential Unit Citation (United States)